The Golden Hare with a Voice of Silver is a double compilation album by British experimental music group Coil, released in October 2002 by their vanity label Eskaton and distributed via World Serpent Distribution. It compiles two Russian compilation albums released by Feelee Records in 2001, A Guide for Beginners: The Voice of Silver and A Guide for Finishers: Golden Hair, with the former being disc one and the latter being disc two, respectively.

The catalogue number for this release is Eskaton 29.

Track listing

References

External links
 
 
 The Golden Hare with a Voice of Silver at Brainwashed

2002 compilation albums
Coil (band) compilation albums